, known professionally as Toman, is a Japanese actor, model, and former singer. He began his career as an amateur model and is credited with popularizing genderless fashion in Japan. In 2016, he debuted in the boy band XOX as their leader and later left the group in 2017.

Early life

Toman was born on September 14, 1993, in Miyagi Prefecture. In junior high school, he dressed in  outfits using the magazine Men's Egg as an example. While he was in high school, he began to imitate Korean fashion seen in K-pop and began wearing make-up and colored contacts. During this time, his blog gained attention when he posted an image of himself styled after South Korean singer Kim Jae-joong. In high school, he was also classmates with Japanese actor Mario Kuroba. After graduating from high school, Toman studied abroad in Sydney, Australia, for 10 months.

Career

After returning to Japan, Toman attended an event held for models Yohdi Kondo and Tom Fujita, where one of the staff members had noticed him and mentioned his blog. Inspired, Toman decided to work at a clothing shop in Sendai to increase his profile and subsequently became a reader model for various fashion magazines. Around 2015, when genderless fashion gained popularity, Toman began making television appearances as the fashion subculture's representative. The term "genderless" to describe the fashion subculture was coined by his agent, Takashi Marumoto, to name Toman's aesthetic.

In 2016, Toman debuted in a boy band XOX as their leader. He left the group on November 28, 2017.

Filmography

Film

Television

Theater

References

External links

 

1993 births
Actors from Miyagi Prefecture
Japanese film actors
Japanese television actors
Japanese male models
Japanese male stage actors
Japanese YouTubers
Living people